The 6th Directors Guild of America Awards, honoring the outstanding directorial achievements in film and television in 1953, were presented in 1954.

Winners and nominees

Film

Television

D.W. Griffith Award
 John Ford

External links
 

Directors Guild of America Awards
1953 film awards
1953 television awards
Direct
Direct
1953 awards in the United States